The Denver Gas & Electric Building, also known as the Public Service Building and the Insurance Exchange Building, is a building located in the downtown district of Denver, Colorado. Designed by architect Harry W.J. Edbrooke for the Denver Gas & Electric Company, the 10 story building was completed in 1910. One of its most striking features is the use of 13,000 electric light bulbs decorating its façade.

In 1978, the building was listed on the National Register of Historic Places.

References

External links

Colorado State Register of Historic Properties
National Register of Historic Places in Denver